Highland Papua is a province of Indonesia, which roughly follows the borders of Papuan customary region of Lano-Pago, shortened to La Pago.

Formally established on 11 November 2022 from the central and mountainous former part of the province of Papua, it is located on the central highlands of Western New Guinea, where it is the only landlocked province in Indonesia. It also the only province entirely surrounded by the same island in Indonesia. The capital of Highland Papua is Wamena, in  Jayawijaya Regency. The bill of the province's establishment was approved by the People's Representative Council on 30 June 2022, with the bill signed into Law No. 16/2022 by President of Indonesia on 25 July, making it one of Indonesia's three then-youngest provinces, alongside Central Papua and South Papua.

History

Dutch East Indies Expedition 

Sailor Jan Carstenszoon in the 17th century had recorded the existence of high snow-covered mountains in the middle of the island of Papua even though it was located on the equator. The Europeans called this area terra incognita which means a mysterious uncharted area. The first contact of the interior tribes of the Papuan Highlands Province with the outside world occurred during an expedition led by Hendrikus Albertus Lorentz in 1909 to find a path to reach Wilhelmina Peak (now called Trikora Peak) which is steep and covered in snow. The members of the expedition rested and saw the traditional procession in the village of the Pesechem or Pesegem tribe. After this expedition, many other expeditions were carried out by de Bruyn, Franssen Herderschee, Karel Doorman, and others.

An expedition by van Overeem and Kremer in 1920 succeeded in finding the Swart Valley (now the Toli Valley of the Tolikara Regency) and the Dani people who lived there. This expedition then discovered Lake Habema and managed to reach Wilhelmina Peak from the north side. The Baliem Valley inhabited by the Dani Tribe was discovered by accident from an airplane by an expedition led by Richard Archbold from the American Museum of Natural History in 1938. This expedition was strengthened by dozens of Dutch soldiers and Dayak people as porters. The Dutch called the Baliem Valley the Groote Vallei or the Great Valley. 

Mitchel Zuckoff in his book entitled Lost in Shangri-La 2011 revealed, during World War II this area had not been mapped. This region claimed many victims because of its geography, consisting of high cloudy mountains and dense forests and unfamiliar tribes. One of the most famous incidents occurred on May 13, 1945 with a Gremlin Special plane crashing into the edge of a mountain. Special operations were then dispatched and three people were rescued. Their story of survival made headlines.

Church mission and colonial government established 

Christianity entered the Baliem Valley in 1954 by a team of missionaries from the American Christian and Missionary Alliance (C&MA) flown in from Sentani. Its members include pastors Lloyd Evan Stone and Einer Mickelson. Shortly after, The Dutch government through Frits Veldkamp also established a government post here to strengthen its influence in the interior. Then villages, airfields, and other infrastructure facilities were built in this area which became the forerunner of Wamena City. Wamena's birthday is commemorated every 10 December 1956 according to the establishment of this Dutch government post.

The Sterrengebergte or Star Mountains located in the far east near the country's borders was one of the unexplored areas of the Netherlands. The Royal Netherlands Geographical Society or KNAG ( Koninklijk Nederlandsch Aardrijkskundig Genootschap) then launched an expedition in 1959, bringing scientists from various fields such as zoology, botany, and anthropology. In addition to gaining a variety of new knowledge about the region and its inhabitants, expedition members also managed to climb Juliana Peak (now called Mandala Peak). Before embarking on this expedition, a survey was first conducted to find a suitable place to be used as a camp and an airstrip. Dutch officials such as Jan Sneep, Nol Hermans and Pim Schoorl were sent on a small expedition to the Sibil Valley in 1955 and met the Sibil or Ngalum people. In 1958-1959, the Baliem Valley was subdued under the rule of the Dutch government with the abolition of inter-tribal conflicts and between indigenous peoples and missionaries. Dutch rule in this area was short with the annexation of Dutch New Guinea into Indonesia in 1969.

Under Indonesian rule 
After Dutch New Guinea was successfully annexed into Indonesia, the government issued Law No. 12 of 1969 concerning the Establishment of the Autonomous Province of West Irian and Autonomous Regencies in the Province of West Irian. One of them was Jayawijaya Regency which included the Local Government areas of Baliem, Bokondini, Tiom, and Oksibil. These regencies were forerunners of the Highland Papua Province. In 2002, Jayawijaya Regency was divided into Jayawijaya, Yahukimo, Bintang Mountains, and Tolikara Regencies. Then in 2008, Jayawijaya Regency was again divided into Jayawijaya, Lanny Jaya, Nduga, Central Mamberamo, and Yalimo Regencies. The 8 regencies of the Jayawijaya division were finally reunited into the Highland Papua Province with its capital at Wamena in 2022.

Since it was annexed to Indonesia, this area has been marked by acts of violence by the pro-independence group Free Papua Organization (OPM). Several incidents caused by Free Papua Organization include research team hostage in Mapenduma in 1996, killing of Istaka Karya workers who were building a bridge in Nduga in 2018, and the burning of high schools and health centers along with the killing of health workers in the Pegunungan Bintang Regency. In the highlands of Papua, there are also frequent community unrest which caused material losses and casualties, for example the burning of government offices in Yalimo due to the 2021 regional elections, riots in Wamena in 2019 that killed 10 Minang migrants, and clashes between Lanny Jaya residents and Nduga residents in Wouma, Jayawijaya using arrows and burning houses in 2022.

Formation of Highland Papua Province 

Highland Papua was formally created on 25 July 2022, along with South Papua and Central Papua. Soon after the approval of the bill for the creation of the province on 30 June, Pegunungan Bintang Regency objected to their inclusion in the new province, stating that their access to public services are much closer to Jayapura than to Wamena, and demanded to stay instead within Papua province or to be created as a new province of Okmekmin (its residents had been advocating for a new cultural region of Okmekmin as they consider themselves different from other La Pago tribes). But their inclusion was rejected by Tabi customary council of the original Papua province as well as from the South and Highlands. Local government officials and some residents of the regency threatened to secede and join Papua New Guinea if their demands were not met.

On 16 July when the province was waiting to be formalized, Papuan gunmen shot and killed eleven civilians (mostly traders from other islands) and injured two others in the village of Nogolait, Nduga Regency. 

After Law no. 16 of 2022 was inaugurated, the regents in the new province collaborated with the Ministry of Home Affairs through the Kelompok Kerja (Pokja) III Task Force to Guard the New Autonomous Region to establish the location of the governor's office and temporary service, the provisional budget prior to the regional elections, the State Civil Apparatus (ASN), as well as grants from each regencies, the parent province, and the central government. Pokja also reviewed the potential location of the future Provincial Government office centre with alternatives offered between Muliama District, Wamena, Megapura, or Hubikiak. Meanwhile, the temporary governor's office is located at the Jayawijaya Regency Education Office although there are other recommendations such as the Wamena Mall. The temporary governor's office sign was installed on 6 September 2022 but was vandalised a day later by 9 members of the Jayawijaya Regency Student Association (HMKJ) who were eventually arrested by the police.

Politics

Government 
The province follows the original administrative boundaries of Jayawijaya Regency between 1969 and 2002. Culturally, Highland Papua roughly covers the customary region of La Pago.

Administrative divisions 

The new province comprises eight regencies (kabupaten), listed below with their areas and their populations at the 2020 Census and according to the official estimates as at mid 2021. Until 2002 all eight of the current regencies now comprising this province were part of a larger Jayawijaya Regency, but on 11 December 2002 three new regencies were created from parts of that regency - Pegunungan Bintang (Bintang Mountains), Tolikara and Yahukimo. Subsequently on 4 January 2008 another four new regencies were created from other parts of Jayawijaya Regency - Lanny Jaya, Mamberamo Tengah (Central Mamberamo), Nduga and Yalimo.

Environment

Geography and Climate 

The landscape of Papua Mountains is in the form of valleys where people live flanked by high mountains. The beautiful scenery and fresh air make this region a destination for adventure. With the services of a tour guide, travelers can walk to visit villages scattered throughout the valley with their honorary houses and traditional lifestyles. However, many villages must be travelled through steep and dangerous paths such as near ravines and even crossing rivers.

Culture 

The native Papuan people has a distinct culture and traditions that cannot be found in other parts of Indonesia. Coastal Papuans are usually more willing to accept modern influence into their daily lives, which in turn diminishes their original culture and traditions. Meanwhile, most inland Papuans still preserves their original culture and traditions, although their way of life over the past century are tied to the encroachment of modernity and globalization. Each Papuan tribe usually practices their own tradition and culture, which may differ greatly from one tribe to another.

One of the most well-known Papuan tradition is the stone burning tradition (Indonesian: Tradisi Bakar Batu or Barapen), which is practiced by most Papuan tribes in the province. The stone burning tradition is an important tradition for all indigenous Papuans. For them, is a form of gratitude and a gathering place between residents of the village. This tradition is usually held when there are births, traditional marriages, the coronation of tribal chiefs, and the gathering of soldiers. It is usually carried out by indigenous Papuan people who live in the interior, such as in the Baliem Valley, Panaiai, Nabire, Pegunungan Bintang, and others. other. The name of this tradition varies in each region. In Paniai, the stone burning tradition is called Gapiia. Meanwhile, in Wamena it is called Kit Oba Isogoa, while in Jayawijaya it is called Barapen. It is called the stone burning tradition because the stone is actually burned until it is hot. The function of the hot stone is to cook meat, Sweet potatoes, and vegetables on the basis of banana leaves which will be eaten by all residents at the ongoing event.

The finger cutting tradition (Indonesian: Tradisi Potong Jari) is practiced among the Dani people of the Baliem Valley in central Papua. The tradition of cutting fingers on the Dani people has existed since ancient times and is still being carried out today. This tradition symbolizes harmony, unity, and strength that comes from within a person and within a family. According to the culture of the Dani people, family is the most valuable pedestal that a human has, fingers are believed to symbolize the existence and function of a family itself. So that the tradition of cutting is carried out when someone loses a family member or relative such as husband, wife, children, younger siblings and older siblings forever. For Dani people, sadness and grief due to adversity and the loss of a family member are not only appreciated by crying, but also cutting fingers. The Dani people believes that cutting off a finger is a symbol of the sadness and pain of losing a family member. The finger-cutting tradition is also seen as a way to prevent the recurrence of a catastrophe that claimed the life of a grieving family member.

Arts and performance 

There are a lot of traditional dances that are native to the province of Papua. Each Papuan tribe would usually have their own unique traditional dances.

Each Papuan tribe usually has their own war dance. The Papuan war dance is one of the oldest dances of the Papuan people because this classical dance has been around for thousands of years and is even one of the legacies of Indonesia's prehistoric times. In Papuan culture, this dance is a symbol of how strong and brave the Papuan people are. Allegedly, this dance was once a part of traditional ceremonies when fighting other tribes and now can be seen preserved during Baliem Valley Festival. The dancers who perform this dance are a group of men, the number starts from seven people or more. They danced to the sound of drums and war songs. Their movements were characteristically excited as if they were warriors heading for battle. The Papuan war dance is very unique, varied and energetic to indicate the heroism and courage of the Papuan people. Apart from the dancers movements in playing the weapons they carry, the uniqueness of this dance is also seen in the dancers' clothes.

Architecture 

Papua is famous for its varieties of traditional houses, one of which is a traditional house called honai. Honai is a traditional Papuan house, especially in the mountainous region. The basic shape of the honai is a circle with a wooden frame and woven walls and a conical roof made of straw. The honai is spread across almost all corners of the Baliem Valley which covers an area of 1,200 square kilometers. The distance from the surface of the house to the ceiling is only about 1 meter. Within the honai, there is a fireplace which is located right in the middle. The thatched roof and wooden walls of the Honai actually bring cool air inside If the air is too cold, the whole house will be warmed by the smoke from the fireplace. For the Dani people, smoke from firewood is no longer unusual for being smoked for a long time. As long as the door is still open, oxygen can still flow inside. The honai is supported by 4 main poles called heseke, which are stuck in the ground at a certain distance (about 1 meter) so that they are square. In the middle of this main pillar is placed a fireplace called a round wulikin. An honai is made in an attic so that it is divided into two rooms, at the top it is called henaepu as a bed and the bottom is called agarowa as a place to rest, tell stories or chat, and eat. The upper part of the attic or floor is made of fruit wood and covered with woven lokop wood (a kind of very small bamboo) and can be covered again with straw or dry grass. There is usually only one door in the honai, which is small and short so that people come out and enter on all fours. To the left or right of the entrance is a door leading to the attic.

Traditional weapons and armors 
Weapons and armors from these section is from Dani people of Kurulu District of Jayawijaya.

The Papuan spear is referred to by the local community as "Tul". The spear was a weapon that could be used for both fighting and hunting. In addition, Papuan culture often uses the spear as a property in dances. The material used to construct the spears are from Papuan ironwood called Kayu Yoli or blackwood called Kayu Yomalo, river stone that was sharpened as a spearhead or instead used to sharpen the tip. For that reason, the spear is able to survive as a weapon that must be present in hunting and fighting activities. What makes this traditional Papuan weapon feel special is that there is a rule not to use a spear other than for hunting and fighting purposes. For example, it is forbidden to cut young tree shoots with a spear, or to use a spear to carry garden produce. If this rule was broken, the person who wielded this spear would have bad luck. Meanwhile, in the manufacturing process, this spear frame takes a long time. Starting from the wood taken from the tree, then cut to the size of 3 m and dried in the sun. After drying it in the sun, the wood for the handle is shaped in such a way, then rubbed with sea snail powder until it is sharp, which takes about 1 week. In traditional Papuan customs, the spear is interpreted as a symbol of a man's prowess. Therefore, the spears must always be properly stored. Usually hung from the ceiling or placed on a house wall support.

The bow and arrow is a traditional Papuan weapon that has uses for hunting wild boar and other animals. In addition, the Papuan bow and arrow were tools that were always carried side by side with the spear. Arrows used for war are called Suap, meanwhile arrows used for hunting birds are called Wam Wakiwy with the difference on the arrowheads. If the aim is to hunt birds, then the arrowheads used are made of Kayu Yomalo and Kayu Dion and made three-pronged with two serrated tips and one not serrated tip, to hunt pigs a bamboo tip is used instead. Meanwhile, when going to war, the indigenous tribes in Papua have rules that require that the spearhead used is made of animal bones or hardwood, meanwhile the shaft is made from Pohon Atar. In addition, arrows also function as property and souvenirs for home decoration in several areas in Papua, including Jayapura, Wamena, and Kurulu. In these areas, arrows are only intended for house collections. The collection of bows and arrows is also not allowed to be placed carelessly, that is, they are placed on the wall of the house to still respect the culture of the services of the arrow.

Papuan Stone Axes are called Jee Jugum usually made from river stones with the colour of green, dark blue, and black. The stones were then split in half, marked according to the design and grinded with another stone. Water is prepared beforehand to cool the stones from getting to hot. They were used for households needs, chop woods, and kill enemies in battlefields. In Kurulu, the axe has symbolic meaning during construction of Itonay houses.

Papuan Chisels are traditional Papuan weapons that have various uses, such as cutting rattan for weaving, tools for punching holes in wood, as well as emergency tools for stabbing enemies in the event of war. However, most of their functions have now shifted to tools used in the carpentry field. Historically, in ancient times a chisel was a tool used to trim the fingers during mourning of a dead family member. Unfortunately, this culture has been strongly discouraged and sometimes banned by the government and can only be used as a tool in industry. The chisel-making process is not complicated but can take up to two weeks to make. The handle will have Kele Makwy coiled wrappings made from wood fibers and secured using hidden pegs made from ironwood or cassowary bones.

Papuan knife blades are usually used for slashing or cutting when hunting animals in the forest. Even though the animals they face are large mammals and crocodiles, the Papuan people still adhere to prevailing customs. The custom is that it is not permissible to use any kind of firearm when hunting. Papuan Daggers are knives made of bones of the cassowary or pigs, 15-20 cm long. It was then sharpened using stone and shaped like a dagger. they were used for ceremonial purposes and to cut vegetables or meat during cooking.

The Papuan parang called by the name "jalowy". In the manufacturing process, this Papuan machete takes a lot of time. Derived from a split stone, then sharpened and shaped to form a machete that has an edge. To increase the level of hardness and durability, machete craftsmen add pork oil and pork blood before sharpening it multiple times until it is smooth and sharp. Papuan parangs basically has many uses. For household purposes, namely cooking, cutting meat, and cutting down sago. In addition, Papuan machetes are also used in the agricultural industry, and for dowry during weddings but only the ones made from heirloom stones. Furthermore, parang can also be used as home decoration and collection.

Papuan armors consists of shields called Wali Moken and worn body armors called Walimo. Wali Moken is made from sea shells and wood barks, it is usually hanged on the neck to protect the torso. Sea shells are arranged in a row and tied at the ends using wood barks or rattans. Usually it takes a month to made one piece of armor. Walimo is made from rattan and wood barks. The rattans were cleaned and shaped till they have rounded cross-section, then woven like forming a basket and shaped to be worn like a shirt. Their function is to protect the body from arrows from piercing the body, other uses include worn for ceremonial purposes and as part of traditional dance attire.

Music and handicrafts 

Pikon is a traditional wind instrument typical of the Hubala tribe of the Dani people inhabiting the Baliem Valley which is made of bamboo. Pikon comes from the word Pikonane in the Dani languages, which means a sound musical instrument. The icon is oval-shaped. Pikon is made of bamboo, in which a vibrating stick is attached with a rope in the middle, so that it is able to produce a variety of sounds. This musical instrument is generally played by men in the Dani people. They play pikon as a fatigue reliever, even though the resulting sound tends not to be melodious because it is just like the sound of birds chirping without tone. However, with the development of the times, now the sounds made by Pikon can be heard as do, mi and sol tones. Pikon is also played in the Baliem Jayawijaya Valley Cultural Festival commemorating Indonesia's Independence Day. The length of the picon in general is 5.2 cm. The way to play pikon is to blow the center of the bamboo that has been given a hole while pulling the rope that joins the stick. Pikon can also be formed using a hite, which is the bark of an arrow.

The Noken is a traditional Papuan bag carried with a head and made of bark fibers. Similar to bags, in general, this bag is used to carry daily necessities. Papuan people usually use it to bring agricultural products such as vegetables, tubers and also to bring merchandise to the market. Because of its uniqueness that is carried with its head, this noken is registered with UNESCO as one of the traditional works and world cultural heritage. On 4 December 2012, the noken was listed in the UNESCO Intangible Cultural Heritage Lists as a cultural heritage of Indonesia. In several areas of Papua, noken – instead of the usual ballot box – is preferred as a way to place ballots, where it is recognized as a ballot tool in the Papua regional leadership elections.

The koteka is a penis sheath traditionally worn by native male inhabitants of some (mainly highland) ethnic groups in New Guinea to cover their genitals. They are normally made from a dried-out gourd, Lagenaria siceraria, although unrelated species such as pitcher-plant Nepenthes mirabilis, are also used. They are held in place by a small loop of fiber attached to the base of the koteka and placed around the scrotum. A secondary loop placed around the chest or abdomen is attached to the main body of the koteka. It is traditional clothing in certain New Guinea highlands societies including in the Grand Baliem Valley. It is worn without other clothing, tied in upward position. Many tribes can be identified by the way they wear their koteka. Some wear them pointed straight out, straight up, at an angle, or in other directions. The diameter of the koteka can also be a clue. Contrary to popular belief, there is little correlation between the size or length of the koteka and the social status of the wearer. In 1971–1972 the Indonesian New Order government launched "Operasi Koteka" ("Operation Penis Gourd") which consisted primarily of trying to encourage the people to wear shorts and shirts because such clothes were considered more "modern". But the people did not have changes of clothing, did not have soap, and were unfamiliar with the care of such clothes so the unwashed clothing caused skin diseases. There were also reports of men wearing the shorts as hats and the women using the dresses as carrying bags.

Cuisine 

The native Papuan food usually consists of roasted boar with Tubers such as sweet potato. The staple food of Papua and eastern Indonesia in general is sago, as the counterpart of central and western Indonesian cuisines that favour rice as their staple food. In Papua, pig roast which consists of pork and yams are roasted in heated stones placed in a hole dug in the ground and covered with leaves; this cooking method is called bakar batu (burning the stone), and it is an important cultural and social event among Papuan people. In some Papuan communities who are Muslim or when welcoming Muslim guests, pork can be replaced with chicken or beef or mutton or can be cooked separately with pork. This is, for example, practiced by the Walesi and Meteo communities in Jayawijaya Regency to welcome the holy month of Ramadan.

In the inland regions, Sago worms are usually served as a type of snack dish. Sago worms come from sago trunks which are cut and left to rot. The rotting stems cause the worms to come out. The shape of the sago worms varies, ranging from the smallest to the largest size of an adult's thumb. These sago caterpillars are usually eaten alive or cooked beforehand, such as stir-frying, cooking, frying and then skewered. But over time, the people of Papua used to process these sago caterpillars into sago caterpillar satay. To make satay from this sago caterpillar, the method is no different from making satay in general, namely on skewers with a skewer and grilled over hot coals.

Udang selingkuh is a type of prawn dish native to Wamena and the surrounding area. Udang selingkuh is usually served grilled with minimal seasoning, which is only salt. The slightly sweet natural taste of this animal makes it quite salty. The serving of Udang selingkuh is usually accompanied by warm rice and papaya or kale. It is usually also served with the colo-colo sambal combination which has a spicy-sweet taste.

Religion

See also

Papua
Central Papua
South Papua
West Papua

References

 
Provinces of Indonesia
States and territories established in 2022
2022 establishments in Indonesia